Friedrich Schiller is a 1923 German silent historical film directed by Curt Goetz and starring Theodor Loos, Hermann Vallentin, and Ilka Grüning. It is a biopic of the life of the eighteenth century writer Friedrich Schiller. In 2005 the film was restored with a slightly shorter running length.

The film's sets were designed by the art director Julian Ballenstedt. Location shooting took place in Stuttgart.

Cast

References

Bibliography

External links

1923 films
1920s biographical films
1920s historical films
German biographical films
German historical films
Films of the Weimar Republic
German silent feature films
Films directed by Curt Goetz
German black-and-white films
Biographical films about writers
Films set in the 1770s
Films set in the 1780s
Cultural depictions of Friedrich Schiller
1920s German films